Procter is a surname, and may refer to

 Adelaide Anne Procter (1825–1864), British poet, daughter of Bryan Procter
 Andrew Procter (cricketer) (born 1968), English cricketer
 Andrew Procter (born 1983), British association football player for Accrington Stanley F. C.
 Arthur Procter (disambiguation)
 Ben Procter (born 1990), British swimmer
 Ben H. Procter (1927–2012), American historian
 Bryan Procter (1787–1874), British poet
 Charles Procter (died 1773), Canadian ship owner and politician
 Chrystabel Procter (1894–1982), English gardener, educationalist and horticulturalist
 Cory Procter (born 1982), American football player
 Donna Procter (born 1969), Australian Olympic swimmer
 Emily Procter (born 1968), American actress
 Ernest Procter (1885–1935), English designer, illustrator and painter
 Evelyn Procter (1897–1980), British historian
 Henry Procter (disambiguation)
 Joan Beauchamp Procter (1897–1931), British herpetologist
 Joe Procter (1906–1989), New Zealand rugby union player
 John Procter (disambiguation)
 Leslie Procter (1884–1968), Australian politician
 Luke Procter (born 1988), English cricketer
 Maurice Procter (1906–1973), English novelist
 Mike Procter (born 1946), South African cricketer
 Norma Procter (1928–2017), English contralto
 Peter Procter (born 1930), British cycling champion, rally driver and racing driver
 Raymond Procter (born 1938), New Zealand cricketer
 Richard Wright Procter (1816–1881), English barber, poet and author
 Simon Procter (born 1968), British artist and photographer
 William Procter (disambiguation)
William Procter (candlemaker) (1801–1884), co-founder of Procter & Gamble
William Cooper Procter (1862–1934), grandson of William Procter, he headed Procter & Gamble from 1907 to 1930
William Procter Jr. (1817–1874), American pharmacist
William Procter (Canadian veteran) (1899–2005), one of the last Canadian veterans of World War I to die
Procter (film), a 2002 short film directed by Joachim Trier
 Procter, an unincorporated community in British Columbia, Canada

See also
Proctor (disambiguation)
Procter & Gamble, consumer products multinational
Goodwin Procter, American law firm

Occupational surnames
English-language occupational surnames